Malika Burkhonova (born 22 February 1999) is an Uzbekistani footballer who plays as a midfielder for Women's Championship club Sevinch and the Uzbekistan women's national team.

International career
Burkhonova capped for Uzbekistan at senior level during the 2018 AFC Women's Asian Cup qualification and the 2020 AFC Women's Olympic Qualifying Tournament.

International goals
Scores and results list Uzbekistan's goal tally first

See also
List of Uzbekistan women's international footballers

References 

1999 births
Living people
Women's association football midfielders
Uzbekistani women's footballers
People from Qashqadaryo Region
Uzbekistan women's international footballers
Uzbekistani women's futsal players
20th-century Uzbekistani women
21st-century Uzbekistani women